Kenneth Gordon (December 1887 – 27 July 1951) was a South African cricketer. He played in one first-class match for Border in 1913/14.

See also
 List of Border representative cricketers

References

External links
 

1887 births
1951 deaths
South African cricketers
Border cricketers
Sportspeople from Qonce